Zeyn ol Abedin (also Romanized as Zeyn ol ‘Ābedīn) is a village in Neysan Rural District, Neysan District, Hoveyzeh County, Khuzestan Province, Iran. At the 2006 census, its population was 48, in 7 families.

References 

Populated places in Hoveyzeh County